Kulwant Singh Pandori (born 5 January 1973) is an Indian politician and a member of Aam Aadmi Party. In 2017, he was elected as the member of the Punjab Legislative Assembly from Mehal Kalan Assembly constituency.

He was born on 5 January 1973 in Pandori in Punjab, India. 
He worked as a journalist and served as the incharge of Malwa region for newspapers namely Ajit, Rozana Spokesman and Pehredaar.

Political career
Pandori is a member of the Aam Aadmi Party.

Member of Legislative Assembly first term
Pandori as an MLA represents the Mehal Kalan Assembly constituency. Pandori won the 2017 Punjab Legislative Assembly election from Mehal Kalan on an Aam Aadmi Party ticket. He defeated Ajit Singh Shant of the Shiromani Akali Dal by over 27064 votes.
Committee assignments of Punjab Legislative Assembly
 Member (2017–18) of Subordinate Legislation Committee 
 Member (2018–19) of Library Committee

Member of Legislative Assembly Second term
He represents the Mehal Kalan Assembly constituency as MLA in Punjab Assembly. The Aam Aadmi Party gained a strong 79% majority in the sixteenth Punjab Legislative Assembly by winning 92 out of 117 seats in the 2022 Punjab Legislative Assembly election. MP Bhagwant Mann was sworn in as Chief Minister on 16 March 2022.

Committee assignments of Punjab Legislative Assembly
Chairman (2022–23) Committee on Privileges

Electoral performance

References 

Politicians from Barnala district
Aam Aadmi Party politicians from Punjab, India
Punjab, India MLAs 2017–2022
1973 births
Living people
Punjab, India MLAs 2022–2027